Villa Bartolomea is a comune (municipality) in the Province of Verona in the Italian region Veneto, located about  southwest of Venice and about  southeast of Verona.

Villa Bartolomea borders the following municipalities: Castagnaro, Castelnovo Bariano, Giacciano con Baruchella, Legnago, and Terrazzo.

References

External links
 Official website

Cities and towns in Veneto